Confessions of the Mind is the tenth studio album by the Hollies. It was released in the United States as Moving Finger, with a different track sequence and the tracks "Separated" and "I Wanna Shout" replaced with the Clarke/Sylvester penned "Marigold: Gloria Swansong" saved from the previous album (Hollies Sing Hollies) and "Gasoline Alley Bred". In Germany, it was released by Hansa as Move On with an alternate track sequence with "Gasoline Alley Bred" added. The UK version peaked at number 30 in the charts and the US version at number 183.

Overview and recording
Nearly all of the songs were written either by guitarist Tony Hicks or by the songwriting team of Allan Clarke and Terry Sylvester. Tony Hicks revealed in an interview that the band at this time was influenced by the style of rivals such as Jethro Tull and Crosby, Stills, Nash & Young. "Our songwriting has also undergone change," Tony said to Disc and Music Echo. "I used to write about love mainly, but now I choose more general subjects. I’m writing about worldly affairs and more important issues. They mean so much more." Originally, the album was to open with a poetry reading by drummer Bobby Elliott in the style of The Moody Blues' albums. The track "Bobby's Prologue" was even recorded, but the idea was eventually abandoned. The Hollies began work on the album in early November 1969, with recording sessions lasting until May 1970. The basis of the opening track "Survival of the Fittest", co-written by Graham Nash, was recorded in August 1969, still with Nash in the studio, but his vocals were later replaced with Terry Sylvester's. The Hollies worked on Hicks's "Too Young To Be Married" during the sessions of the previous album Hollies Sing Hollies, but did not complete it then. "Isn't It Nice?" and bluesy "Perfect Lady Housewife", both written by Clarke and Terry Sylvester, were older tunes from the abandoned stage musical Oh Flux!. During the recording process, several other songs were made and released as singles ("I Can't Tell the Bottom from the Top", B-sides "Mad Professor Blyth" and "Dandelion Wine"), some songs remained in the archives and were released years later on various compilations ("Sign of the Times", "Eleanor's Castle") and some remain unreleased to this day ("Bobby's Prologue", "Snow on Heather Moon", re-recording of Clarke-Nash's "Wings").
Keyboardist Reg Dwight (soon to be known as Elton John) participated in the recording of the album, playing on the songs "Perfect Lady Housewife" and the single "I Can't Tell the Bottom from the Top".

Release and reception
The LP was packaged in a plain black and white cover with the album title and The Hollies name (and lyrics on the back). Confessions of the Mind had mostly positive reviews, Reveille (newspaper) called the LP "an outstanding album on which all of the songs are good", and reaching the UK Top 30. However, the original release of the album had an insert with a color photograph of the band. With the Top 10 hit "I Can't Tell the Bottom from the Top" as the lead single from these sessions, none of the songs on the album were selected for another 45 release in the UK or the US, although "Too Young To Be Married" was issued as a single in many countries and became a No. 1 single in Australia, New Zealand and Malaysia (the single would have been certified gold). A live version of the song appeared on the concert album "Hollies Live Hits" released in March 1977. Another album track "Man Without A Heart" was released as a single in the Netherlands and went to No. 25.

Track listing

Moving Finger 

Moving Finger is the tenth US album by the Hollies, released on Epic Records in stereo (E 30255) on December 21, 1970. It omitted two songs from the UK Confessions of the Mind track listing, "Separated" and "I Wanna Shout", and were both replaced by "Marigold: Gloria Swansong" (reserved from Hollies Sing Hollies) and "Gasoline Alley Bred".

Personnel 
Tracks 2, 6, 8, and 9 include accompaniment arranged and conducted by Johnny Scott.
The Hollies
Allan Clarke - vocals, guitar, harmonica
Tony Hicks - guitar, vocals
Terry Sylvester - guitar, vocals
Bernie Calvert - bass, keyboards
Bobby Elliott - drums
Graham Nash - rhythm guitar (on "Survival of the Fittest")

References 

1970 albums
The Hollies albums
Parlophone albums
Epic Records albums
Albums produced by Ron Richards (producer)